Burlington Township is one of fourteen townships in Carroll County, Indiana. As of the 2010 census, its population was 1,742 and it contained 746 housing units.

History
Burlington Township was organized in 1832.

Geography

Cities and towns
 Burlington

Unincorporated towns
 Carrollton

Adjacent townships
 Carrollton Township (north)
 Ervin Township, Howard County (east)
 Monroe Township, Howard County (east)
 Warren Township, Clinton County (south)
 Owen Township, Clinton County (southwest)
 Democrat Township (west)
 Monroe Township (northwest)

Major highways
  Indiana State Road 22
  Indiana State Road 29

Cemeteries
The township contains three cemeteries: Asbury, Burlington and Hyde Park.

Education
Burlington Township residents may obtain a library card at the Burlington Community Library in Burlington.

References
 
 United States Census Bureau cartographic boundary files

External links

 Indiana Township Association
 United Township Association of Indiana

Townships in Carroll County, Indiana
Lafayette metropolitan area, Indiana
Townships in Indiana
1832 establishments in Indiana